Buenos Aires Hardcore was the name of the scene that gathered the Hardcore bands that started to play in Buenos Aires in the late 1980s.

The style of these bands was often influenced by the New York hardcore scene; often mixing styles like punk, metal and hip hop, however some bands like Fun People and No Demuestra Interés (N.D.I) were offering a style was far from the violent New York Hardcore style.

Bands that were part of the early Buenos Aires Hardcore scene included:
 No Demuestra Interés (N.D.I) 
 Existencia de Odio (E.D.O.)
 Diferentes Actitudes Juveniles (D.A.J.)
 Buscando Otra Diversión (B.O.D.)
 Minoría Activa
 Acción Reacción 
 Actitud de Cambio
 Alternativa Positiva
 Anesthesia (Fun People)
 Apocalipsis X (1999)
 Asphix
 Autocontrol
 Bhakti (Krsna Core)
 Buenas Intenciones
 Capilla Negra
 Confort Supremo
 Cosas Claras
 Culturas Perdidas
 Defensa y Justicia (Attaque 77)
 Despertar
 Despojados
 División Autista
 Dos Minutos de Advertencia (2 Minutos)
 Eco Violento (1997)
 Enferma Sociedad
 Enquirer (Madhava)
 Eterna Fuerza Natural
 Eterna Inocencia
 Eternidad
 Expresa tu emoción (ex Sakeo)
 Flores del Sol
 Flores Silvestres (2000)
 Fuerza Interna
 Fuerza y Decisión
 Fun People (Anesthesia)
 Funeral Funny (provincia de Córdoba)
 Furia Social Marginada (F.S.M.)
 Humo Likido
 Ideas Totalmente Adolescentes (I.T.A.)
 Indiferencia
 In Fire
 Inminente Destrucción Social (I.D.S)
 Juventud Unida Positiva (J.U.P.)
 Los de Afuera (L.D.A.)
 Massacre Palestina (Massacre (Argentine band))
 Natural
 Nueva Ética
 Nunca Digas Nunca (N.D.N.)
 Opción Crucial
 Otra Opción
 Otra Salida
 Pensar o Morir (de La Plata)
 Propia Decisión (1997)
 Psicotracción
 Raiz (1998)
 Reconcile (1998)
 Redención
 Restos Fósiles
 Suburbia (Sadistikal)
 720º
 Siempre Verdadero (Los Verdaderos)
 Sudarshana(1997)
 Viciados (Charlie Brown / Charlie 3)
 Victimas
 Vieja Escuela (1996)
 Will Champion
 X el Cambio (1998)
 Yoda (1999)

Other important and late bands include 90Raíces, Eterno Enemigo, Scarponi, Dar Sangre, Será Pánico, Contra Todo, Ingobernables.

Argentine styles of music
Hardcore punk
Music in Buenos Aires